Mihovil Fantela (born 22 March 1990) is a Croatian sailor. He and Šime Fantela competed for Croatia at the 2020 Summer Olympics in the 49er event.

References

External links
 
 

1990 births
Living people
Croatian male sailors (sport)
Olympic sailors of Croatia
Sailors at the 2020 Summer Olympics – 49er
Sportspeople from Zadar